Jessica Anne Bond (born Jessica Manafort; June 13, 1982) is an American director, screenwriter, and producer known for her 2007 film Remember the Daze.

Career
In 2007, Bond directed the film Remember the Daze starring Amber Heard, Brie Larson, and Leighton Meester. The film premiered at the 2007 Los Angeles Film Festival under the title The Beautiful Ordinary. Remember the Daze has a 46% Audience rating on Rotten Tomatoes and Peter Debruge in Variety states "Remember the Daze" demonstrates considerable promise on the part of its director. https://variety.com/2007/film/markets-festivals/remember-the-daze-1200558085/amp/

Bond's follow up film Rosy was released on Hulu in 2018. Stacy Martin plays an actress and Nat Wolff as a man obsessed with her. The film also starred Tony Shalhoub, Johnny Knoxville, and Sky Ferreira. Jonathan Schwartz and Alex Bach produced. Rotten Tomatoes shows zero reviews for this film.

Personal life
Bond is the daughter of American lobbyist and campaign manager Paul Manafort. From 2013 to 2017, she was married to real estate developer Jeffrey Yohai. In 2018, Bond announced she was changing her last name both professionally and legally from Manafort to her mother's maiden name, Bond, in order to distance herself from her father after his conviction. She is quoted saying “I am a passionate liberal and a registered Democrat and this has been difficult for me. Although I am ‘the daughter of,’ I am very much my own person and hopefully people can realize that.”

Financial and Legal Controversies
Bond's father, Paul Manafort, invested millions of dollars in Bond’s film projects and her now-ex-husband’s real-estate ventures.

 On November 8, 2019, Bond’s ex husband Yohai was sentenced to more than nine years in prison for a wide-ranging series of fraud schemes. The series of schemes generated more than $13 million, and included one that cheated $3 million from actor Dustin Hoffman. Hoffman and his son, actor Jacob Hoffman, invested with Yohai in a Hollywood Hills property where he planned to build a modern mansion." Jake Hoffman, Jeffrey Yohai, and Jess Bond all attended New York University at the same time.

In a sentencing filing for Yohai, prosecutors revealed that he tried to tamper with the testimony of witnesses against him via “coded” phone calls while Yohai was in a county jail. Prosecutors alleged Yohai called Bond to inform her that he was facing additional charges for pawning stolen musical equipment. Bond was never charged in the case."

Filmography
Remember the Daze (2007) as Jess Bond 
Rosy (2018) (directed)

References

External links

1982 births
Living people
American women film directors
American women screenwriters
21st-century American women